Zhong Jiaqi (born 23 September 1999) is a Chinese field hockey player for the Chinese national team.

She participated at the 2018 Women's Hockey World Cup. In December 2019, she was nominated for the FIH Rising Star of the Year Award.

References

External links

External links
 

1999 births
Living people
Chinese female field hockey players
Youth Olympic gold medalists for China
Field hockey players at the 2020 Summer Olympics
Olympic field hockey players of China
21st-century Chinese women